Want Two is the fourth album by American-Canadian singer-songwriter Rufus Wainwright.  The album was released on November 16, 2004.  Four of the tracks on this album were released in the summer of 2004 as the EP Waiting for a Want on the iTunes music store.

Want Two is, according to Wainwright, the darker sibling of 2003's Want One – its subject matter concerned with "the world we live in" (RW Geffen Bio) after Want One'''s focus on the intensely personal. The artist's song selections here show his range to be broad, veering from romantic ballad ("Peach Trees") to tragic ballad ("This Love Affair"), sophisticated pop ("The One You Love") to third person/first person narrative lament ("The Art Teacher"), personal tongue in cheek manifesto ("Gay Messiah"), to a classical pop hybrid written about Jeff Buckley ("Memphis Skyline") and songs beyond category. "Agnus Dei" is used in the trailer for the 2007 film Trade.

Mother Kate McGarrigle and aunt Anna (McGarrigle) both perform and sing on "Hometown Waltz". Anohni of 2005 Mercury Prize winners Antony and the Johnsons sings lead vocal alongside Wainwright on "Old Whore's Diet".
The initial UK version of the record contains bonus live tracks, "" and "" (written by French Canadian songwriter Gilles Vigneault).

Legacy
The album was also included in the book 1001 Albums You Must Hear Before You Die.

Track listing
 "Agnus Dei" – 5:45
 "The One You Love" – 3:44
 "Peach Trees" – 5:59
 "Little Sister" – 3:22
 "The Art Teacher" – 3:51
 "Hometown Waltz" – 2:33
 "This Love Affair" – 3:13
 "Gay Messiah" – 3:14
 "Memphis Skyline" – 4:51
 "Waiting for a Dream" – 4:14
 "Crumb by Crumb" – 4:13
 "Old Whore's Diet" – 9:09

Bonus tracks
 "" (live) (UK & EU bonus track) – 2:46
 "" (live) (UK bonus track) – 3.23
 "Chelsea Hotel, No. 2" (live) (bonus track on Want) – 3:47
 "In with the Ladies" (bonus track on Want) – 3:52

Live at the Fillmore DVD
"DVD Intro" – 1:26
"L'Absence" – 4:00
"14th Street" – 4:33
"Harvester of Hearts" – 3:41
"Natasha" – 3:24
"The Art Teacher" – 3:34
"Hallelujah" – 4:22
"Matinee Idol" – 2:58
"Vibrate" – 3:17
"Gay Messiah" – 4:17
"Want" – 5:27
"Greek Song" – 3:52
"Foolish Love" – 5:35
"I Don't Know What It Is" – 5:40
"Dinner at Eight" – 5:00
"Beautiful Child" – 6:28
"Oh What a World" – 4:13
"Liberty Cabbage" – 4:56
"California" – 3:28
"As in Happy" – 3:40
"DVD Credits" – 1:35

Personnel

 Rufus Wainwright – voice (1–12), piano (1–7,9,10), additional vocals (2,3,8,11), acoustic guitar (2,3,8,11), keyboards (11), orchestral arrangements (1,4,7,9–11)
 Sophie Solomon – violin (1)
 Pit Hermans – cimbalom (1)
 Marius de Vries – keyboards (1,10,11), vibraphone (3,9), programming (2–4,8–11), orchestral arrangements (1,4,7,9–11)
 Isobel Griffiths – orchestra contractor (1,4,9,11), horn contractor (5,10)
 Gavyn Wright – orchestral leader (1,4,9,11)
 Martha Wainwright – additional vocals (2,3,6,8,12), violin (6)
 Gerry Leonard – electric guitar (2,3), guitars (9)
 Charlie Sexton – electric guitar (2,3)
 Jeff Hill – bass (2,3,8–12), additional vocals (12)
 Levon Helm – drums (2)
 Roberto Rodriguez – percussion (3)
 Sterling Campbell – drums (3,9)
 Matt Johnson – drums (3,8)
 Kate McGarrigle – additional vocals (6), banjo (6)
 Anna McGarrigle – additional vocals (6), accordion (6)
 Lily Lanken – additional vocals (6), recorder (6)
 Brad Albetta – bass guitar (6)
 Maxim Moston – violin (7,10,12), concertmaster (7,10), orchestral arrangements (1,4,7,9–11)
 Antoine Silverman – violin (7,10)
 Joan Wasser – violin (7,10), viola (12)
 Julianne Klopotic – violin (7,10)
 Vivienne Kim – violin (7,10)
 Fiona Murray – violin (7,10)
 Cenovia Cummins – violin (7,10)

 Christopher Cardona – violin (7,10)
 Danielle Farina – viola (7,10)
 Alison Gordon – viola (7,10)
 Eric Hammelman – viola (7,10)
 Kathryn Lockwood – viola (7,10)
 Anja Wood – cello (7,10)
 Jane Scarpantoni – cello (7,10)
 Julia Kent – cello (7,10,12)
 Carlo Pellettieri – cello (7,10)
 Troy Rinker Jr – bass guitar (7,10)
 Alexandra Knoll – oboe (7)
 David Sapadin – clarinet (7)
 Daniel Shelly – bassoon (7)
 Teddy Thompson – additional vocals (8,12)
 Jenni Muldaur – additional vocals (8)
 Suzzy Roche – additional vocals (8)
 Leona Naess – additional vocals (11)
 David Theodore – oboe (11)
 Rob Burger – Hammond organ (11)
 Gina Gershon – Jew's harp (11)
 Antony – voice (12)
 Julianna Raye – additional vocals (12)
 Roger Greenawalt – ukulele (12), banjo (12)
 Steven Wolf – djembe (12), tambourine (12), additional programming (12)
 Alexis Smith – programming (2–4,8–11)
 Van Dyke Parks – orchestral arrangements (1,4,7,9–11)
 Jack McKeever – engineer

Chart positions

Awards

|-
| rowspan=2|2005 || rowspan=2|Want Two'' || GLAAD Media Award – Outstanding Music Artist  || 
|-
| Juno Award – Adult Alternative Album of the Year  ||

References

External links

2004 albums
Geffen Records albums
Rufus Wainwright albums
Albums produced by Marius de Vries